Vacuolar interface dermatitis (VAC, also known as liquefaction degeneration, vacuolar alteration or hydropic degeneration) is a dermatitis with vacuolization at the dermoepidermal junction, with lymphocytic inflammation at the epidermis and dermis.

Causes

An interface dermatitis with vacuolar alteration, not otherwise specified, may be caused by viral exanthems, phototoxic dermatitis, acute radiation dermatitis, erythema dyschromicum perstans, lupus erythematosus and dermatomyositis.

References

Dermatologic terminology